Counter Terrorism Centre (CTC) (TEK) is a Hungarian government agency responsible for national and international counter terrorism including detection, prevention and interruption. The agency has a police tactical unit to respond terrorist incidents and if requested by law enforcement agencies can provide tactical assistance.

TEK provides personal protection including to the Prime Minister and the President and can also provide an escort for extraditions of dangerous persons to the Hungarian border and from abroad. TEK is under the direct control of the Hungarian Ministry of Interior, headed by Sándor Pintér. TEK headquarters is located at Zách street (close to Hungária Boulevard), Pál Maléter Barracks, Kőbánya, Budapest, Hungary.

TEK was founded by the Second Cabinet of Viktor Orbán on 1 September 2010. According to the Hungarian ombudsman (Máté Szabó), TEK is the most professional, well-financed and well-equipped state agency in the country.

Role 
Counter-terrorism: Preventing terrorist attacks
Hostage crisis: Set to free Hungarian hostages nationwide and worldwide
Gun violence: Bank robbery, School shooting
Capturing and arresting dangerous, armed criminals or POIs
Fighting Organized crime: Elimination of mafia organizations
Protecting the Hungarian government, politicians, ambassadors and citizens nationwide and worldwide

Equipment and vehicles 
TEK is using a number of small arms weapons most notably the Glock 17/19, USP, the MP5, the  417 and the 416, along with less-lethal options such as Beanbag guns and rubber-bullets, Taser x26, OC spray, CS gas, Flashbang and Expandable batons. Detailed information about the equipment of TEK is not public, but according to the Hungarian media, it uses armoured Audi Q7 luxury SUVs and BTR-80 armoured personnel carriers equipped with police light bars on the roof. 

According to Sándor Pintér, the Minister of Interior, TEK does not use tanks.

Notable operations 
On 2010 Units of TEK deployed in order to arrest members of extreme BDSM website Mood Pictures in Budapest 

On 10 October 2011, during World War Z filming in Budapest, TEK invaded the crew's stores and also seized several guns, sniper rifles etc. which were used for filming. According to the official statement producers failed to consult with the authorities and despite of the import documentation's indication, all weapons were found to be fully functional. Later prosecutor's office dropped the charges in February 2012.

On August 13, 2012, three Hungarian nationals were held hostage by Syrian gunmen in Damascus. A detachment from TEK was deployed to Syria to set free the Hungarians. They arrived in Budapest on August 27, 2012 without injury.

In 2015 and 2016 the Europe-wide terrorist attacks and threat resulted in increased funds and constant readiness for TEK. They cooperated with the army and police to secure & patrol Budapest after the March 22 Brussels attacks.

References

Bibliography

External links
Budget of the Hungarian Ministry of Interior - State agencies 2012

Law enforcement in Hungary
Law enforcement units
Non-military counterterrorist organizations
Counterterrorism and the European Union
Hungarian intelligence agencies
National security institutions
ATLAS Network